In Greek mythology, King Diomedes of Thrace (Ancient Greek: Διομήδης) was the son of Ares and Cyrene. He lived on the shores of the Black Sea ruling the warlike tribe of Bistones. He is known for his man-eating horses, which Heracles stole in order to complete the eighth of his Twelve Labours, slaying Diomedes in the process.

Mythology 
Heracles encounters King Diomedes through performing his eighth labour.  Eurystheus, King of Tiryns and Heracles' cousin, had sent Heracles to capture the Mares of Diomedes after he had completed his seventh labour, capturing the Cretan Bull. Heracles travelled to the shores of the Black Sea to meet King Diomedes. He was said to have been the son of the god Ares and Cyrene, who is said to be the daughter of Hypseus, King of the Lapiths. King Diomedes was a savage; he enjoyed feeding strangers and prisoners to his mares. They did not like the taste of oats and grain; instead they feasted on human flesh, which their master gave them willingly. His mares could not be controlled; they were savage, just like the King. They could not be tethered by regular rope; instead they needed to be tethered to a bronze manger by chains, so they would not escape.

Upon arrival, Heracles, knowing how King Diomedes treats strangers, wrestles with him, trying to bring King Diomedes to the stables, where the mares live.  Even though Heracles is said to have unmatched strength, it is a long and reasonably even match, since Diomedes himself is the son of the god of war. He eventually loses to Heracles, and is brought to the mares’ manger where they devour him.  It is said that this cures them of their hunger for human flesh. It seems that all they longed for was their master's blood. They become calm and controllable. Heracles is able to bring them back to Tiryns to show Eurystheus his completion of his eighth labour.  Eurytheus dedicates the mares to Hera, goddess of marriage, women and childbirth. Once dedicated they were released and free to roam Argos. One of their descendants is said to be the horse of Alexander the Great. In other translations it is said that the mares are freed to Mount Olympus where some were eaten by wild beasts.

Namesake
Diomedes Lake in Antarctica is named after Diomedes of Thrace.

References

Children of Ares
Mythological kings of Thrace
Kings in Greek mythology
Metamorphoses characters
Greek mythology of Thrace
Mythology of Heracles